Kerala Vikas Congress is a political party led by Jose Chemperi that was found on 25 October 2014 in the Indian state of Kerala.

Alliance and break-up
Kerala Vikas Congress (KVC) had an alliance with BJP in kerala and it also supported the NDA in the centre since 2014 until 2016  when Jose Chemperi decided to break the alliance and go alone in the 2016 Kerala Legislative Assembly elections.

Splinter groups

References

2014 establishments in Kerala
Political parties established in 2014
Political parties in Kerala